Oulad Amghar (Tarifit: Taṛwa Umɣar or Wlad Amɣar, ⵡⵍⴰⴷ ⴰⵎⵖⴰⵔ; Arabic: أولاد أمغار) is a commune in the Driouch Province of the Oriental administrative region of Morocco. At the time of the 2004 census, the commune had a total population of 6342 people living in 1005 households.

References

Populated places in Driouch Province
Rural communes of Oriental (Morocco)